Sabar Koti was an Indian Punjabi singer. He was best known for his song Tennu Ki Dasiye which was one of the hit songs in Punjabi music industry.

Personal life and death 
Sabar Koti was born 20 January 1965, into a family of musicians to Amarnath and Chinti Devi, and he was married to Rita with whom he has three children Alex Koti, William Koti and Rageshwari Koti. Sabar Koti died on 25 January 2018, after a prolonged illness in a hospital in Jalandhar and was cremated in Kot Karar Khan, which was his birthplace. On the day of his funeral, the village council announced to build a memorial in his honour.

Discography

Music albums 

Devotional albums

Filmography

References

External links 

Sabar Koti at the iTunes

1960 births
2018 deaths
Punjabi-language singers
Indian male folk singers
People from Kapurthala district